Players and pairs who neither have high enough rankings nor receive wild cards may participate in a qualifying tournament held one week before the annual Wimbledon Tennis Championships.

Seeds

  Taylor Dent (qualified)
  Björn Phau (second round)
  Somdev Devvarman (second round)
  Thiago Alves (second round)
  Iván Navarro (first round)
  Grega Žemlja (second round)
  Donald Young (first round)
  Édouard Roger-Vasselin (second round)
  Jesse Levine (qualifying competition, lucky loser)
  João Souza (first round)
  Marsel İlhan (qualified)
  Ryan Sweeting (qualifying competition, lucky loser)
  Stefan Koubek (qualifying competition, lucky loser)
  Rui Machado (first round)
  Go Soeda (qualifying competition, lucky loser)
  Santiago Ventura Bertomeu (qualifying competition, lucky loser)
  Tobias Kamke (qualified)
  Julian Reister (qualifying competition, lucky loser)
  Carsten Ball (qualified)
  David Guez (second round)
  Albert Ramos Viñolas (first round)
  Jan Hernych (second round)
  Kevin Kim (second round)
  Ramón Delgado (qualifying competition, lucky loser)
  Mischa Zverev (first round)
  Josselin Ouanna (second round)
  Nicolas Mahut (qualified)
  Dieter Kindlmann (first round)
  Ilija Bozoljac (qualified)
  Ričardas Berankis (qualified)
  Christophe Rochus (first round)
  Santiago González (first round)

Qualifiers

  Taylor Dent
  Martin Fischer
  Ilija Bozoljac
  Carsten Ball
  Rik de Voest
  Ivan Dodig
  Guillermo Alcaide
  Bernard Tomic
  Tobias Kamke
  Jesse Huta Galung
  Marsel İlhan
  Robert Kendrick
  Nicolas Mahut
  Brendan Evans
  Jesse Witten
  Ričardas Berankis

Lucky losers

  Jesse Levine
  Ryan Sweeting
  Stefan Koubek
  Go Soeda
  Santiago Ventura Bertomeu
  Julian Reister
  Ramón Delgado

Qualifying draw

First qualifier

Second qualifier

Third qualifier

Fourth qualifier

Fifth qualifier

Sixth qualifier

Seventh qualifier

Eighth qualifier

Ninth qualifier

Tenth qualifier

Eleventh qualifier

Twelfth qualifier

Thirteenth qualifier

Fourteenth qualifier

Fifteenth qualifier

Sixteenth qualifier

External links

 2010 Wimbledon Championships – Men's draws and results at the International Tennis Federation

Men's Singles Qualifying
Wimbledon Championship by year – Men's singles qualifying